Renate Loll (born 19 June 1962, Aachen) is a  Professor in Theoretical Physics at the Institute for Mathematics, Astrophysics and Particle Physics of the Radboud University in Nijmegen, Netherlands.  She previously worked at the Institute for Theoretical Physics of Utrecht University. She received her Ph.D. from Imperial College, London, in 1989. In 2001 she joined the permanent staff of the ITP, after spending several years at the Max Planck Institute for Gravitational Physics in Golm, Germany.  With Jan Ambjørn and Polish physicist Jerzy Jurkiewicz she helped develop a new approach to  nonperturbative quantization of gravity, that of Causal Dynamical Triangulations.

She has been a member of the Royal Netherlands Academy of Arts and Sciences since 2015.

References

External links 

 Prof Loll's website
 

1962 births
20th-century German  physicists
20th-century German women scientists
21st-century German physicists
21st-century German women scientists
Alumni of Imperial College London
German women physicists
Living people
Members of the Royal Netherlands Academy of Arts and Sciences
People from Aachen
Academic staff of Radboud University Nijmegen
University of Freiburg alumni
University of Potsdam alumni
Academic staff of Utrecht University
20th-century German women
21st-century German women